Katerine Duska (born 5 November 1989) is a Greek-Canadian singer and songwriter. She represented Greece in the Eurovision Song Contest 2019 with the song "Better Love" which was released on 6 March 2019.

Biography
Duska was born on 5 November 1989 in Montreal, Canada, and currently resides in Athens, Greece.

She released her 2015 debut album with the title Embodiment. In 2018, she appeared in a concert at the Concert Hall in Athens performing songs from her album with songs composed by Swedish singer-songwriter Albin Lee Meldau. Meldau also appeared in concert with Duska in September 2018 at the Palace Garden in Athens. In December 2018, she made a guest appearance at a concert of musician Petros Klampanis.

Eurovision Participation
Duska participated in the 2019 Eurovision Song Contest and placed 21st with 74 points after successfully qualifying from the first semi final of the competition. Talking to Wiwibloggs about her song, she said “Love has nothing to do with gender, it’s a very pro-human song”.

Discography

Studio albums

Singles

References

1989 births
Living people
21st-century Greek women singers
Singers from Montreal
Eurovision Song Contest entrants of 2019
Eurovision Song Contest entrants for Greece
Canadian people of Greek descent
Greek pop singers